Stanley Corbett Cowman (14 April 1923 – 2 February 2003) was a New Zealand cricket umpire. He stood in two ODI games in 1983. He was also an honorary curator of the New Zealand Cricket Museum at the Basin Reserve. At the age of 18, he was a flight lieutenant for No. 59 Squadron RAF.

See also
 List of One Day International cricket umpires

References

1923 births
2003 deaths
New Zealand One Day International cricket umpires
New Zealand World War II pilots